The Hudson and Manhattan Railroad Powerhouse, also known as the Jersey City Powerhouse in  Jersey City, Hudson County, New Jersey, United States, was built in 1908. The powerhouse made possible the subway system between New Jersey and New York for the Hudson and Manhattan Railroad (which became PATH in 1963). It was built under the leadership of William Gibbs McAdoo, president of the railroad. The powerhouse was closed in 1929 and used as a storage place for railroad equipment. In the 1990s, the building was cited by Preservation New Jersey as one of the state's ten most endangered historic sites.  The powerhouse was added to the National Register of Historic Places on November 23, 2001, for its significance in architecture, engineering, and transportation.

It is located near the Harborside Financial Center and Harsimus Cove on the Hudson River waterfront in an area undergoing much redevelopment. Efforts to stabilize the powerhouse from further deterioration began July 2009 and continued through 2010. In 2011 the Port Authority of New York and New Jersey agreed to transfer its 55% ownership of the building to its co-owner, Jersey City, in exchange for a nearby lot where they will build an underground electric sub-station. It was determined that the iconic smokestacks could not be saved, leading to their removal.

See also
Powerhouse Arts District, Jersey City
National Register of Historic Places listings in Hudson County, New Jersey
Harsimus Cove Station

References

External links

 
 

Buildings and structures in Jersey City, New Jersey
History of Jersey City, New Jersey
PATH (rail system)
Energy infrastructure completed in 1908
Transport infrastructure completed in 1908
Industrial buildings and structures on the National Register of Historic Places in New Jersey
Railway buildings and structures on the National Register of Historic Places
National Register of Historic Places in Hudson County, New Jersey
New Jersey Register of Historic Places
Railway buildings and structures on the National Register of Historic Places in New Jersey
1908 establishments in New Jersey
Transportation buildings and structures in Hudson County, New Jersey